Welcome to the Other Side is the 15th studio album by the German heavy metal band Rage. It was released in February 2001 by GUN Records. It is considered a concept album revolving around "the journey of a soul after death".

"Straight to Hell" has been featured in the 2001 German Western parody film Der Schuh des Manitu.

Track listing

Personnel

Band members
Peter "Peavy" Wagner - vocals, bass
Victor Smolski - guitars, setar, piano, keyboards, cello, orchestral arrangements
Mike Terrana - drums

Production
Peavy Wagner, Victor Smolski, Mike Terrana - producers
Charly Czajkowski - engineering, mixing
Hans Jörg Maucksch - mastering
Peter Dell - artwork, design

References

Rage (German band) albums
2001 albums
GUN Records albums
Victor Entertainment albums